NGC 988 is a spiral galaxy located in the constellation Cetus. It lies at a distance of 50 million light years from Earth, which, given its apparent dimensions, means that NGC 988 is about 75,000 light years across. Magnitude 7.1 HD 16152 is superposed 52" northwest of the center of NGC 988. The galaxy was discovered by Édouard Jean-Marie Stephan in 1879. One ultraluminous X-ray source has been detected in NGC 988.

NGC 988 is the brightest galaxy in NGC 1052 group (which is also known as NGC 988 group), which also includes the elliptical galaxy NGC 1052, NGC 991, NGC 1022, NGC 1035, NGC 1042, NGC 1047, NGC 1051, NGC 1084, NGC 1110. It belongs in the same galaxy cloud as Messier 77.

One supernova has been discovered in NGC 988, SN 2017gmr, a Type II supernova discovered on 4 September 2017.

References

External links 
 

Spiral galaxies
0988
09843
Astronomical objects discovered in 1879
UGCA objects
Cetus (constellation)